Gardsjøen may refer to several lakes in Norway:

Gardsjøen (Grue), a lake in Grue municipality in Innlandet county
Store Gardsjøen, a lake in Tynset municipality in Innlandet county
Gardsjøen (Sør-Varanger), a lake in Sør-Varanger municipality in Finnmark county

See also
Nedre Gärdsjö, a locality situated in Rättvik Municipality in Dalarna County, Sweden